Glyphodes subamicalis is a moth in the family Crambidae. It was described by Thomas Bainbrigge Fletcher in 1910. It is found on the Seychelles, where it has been recorded from Mahé.

References

Moths described in 1910
Glyphodes